Samuel Timmins (born 23 May 1997) is a New Zealand professional basketball player for the New Zealand Breakers of the National Basketball League (NBL). He played college basketball for the Washington Huskies. In 2022, he helped the Otago Nuggets win the New Zealand NBL championship.

Early life and career
Born in Dunedin, Otago, Timmins moved to Southland as a youth and lived there while his father played for the Southland Stags rugby union team. He was heavily involved in rugby until he was 12 years old, playing as a lock and Number 8 for the Kaikorai club. He also played social basketball, but only began to take the game seriously after he and his family moved back to Dunedin, where he attended Otago Boys' High School.

In 2013, Timmins joined the Otago Nuggets and made his NZNBL debut. At age 15, he became the youngest debutant in Nuggets history. A stress fracture in his back sidelined him for the entire 2014 season. That year, he led Otago Boys' High School to the National Schools Championship and was named tournament MVP. He also helped the Junior Tall Blacks come within three points of winning the Under-18 Oceania Championship final.

In January 2015, following the collapse of the Otago Nuggets, Timmins moved to Christchurch to play for the Canterbury Rams and attend Middleton Grange School. In his debut for the Rams, he had 20 points and nine rebounds. In 16 games during the 2015 season, he averaged 5.7 points and 3.4 rebounds per game.

College career
On 29 April 2015, Timmins signed a National Letter of Intent to play college basketball for the Washington Huskies in 2016–17. He joined the Huskies in December 2015 and practiced and traveled with the team for the remainder of the 2015–16 season.

As a freshman in 2016–17, Timmins saw action in 31 games including 18 starts and averaged 3.2 points and 3.8 rebounds while adding 20 blocks and shooting 48.9 percent from the field. He had a season-high 12 rebounds on two occasions, with his season high in points being 11.

As a sophomore in 2017–18, Timmins started in all 34 games and averaged 4.3 points and 4.6 rebounds per game. He set a career high during the season with 13 points against Kennesaw State.

As a junior in 2018–19, Timmins competed in all 36 games while shooting 62.0 percent from the field (31-50) and averaging 1.9 points and 2.2 rebounds per game. His minutes dropped from 18.0 per game as a sophomore to 10.4 per game as a junior. He had a season-high nine points against UCLA, and had a season-best seven rebounds against Utah while also recording a career high-tying four blocks.

As a senior in 2019–20, Timmins averaged a career-low 7.9 minutes per game to go with 2.0 points and 1.4 rebounds in 31 games.

Professional career
On 18 March 2020, Timmins signed with the Franklin Bulls for the 2020 New Zealand NBL season. On 2 July 2020, he recorded 24 points and 12 rebounds in an 85–79 win over the Otago Nuggets. He led the league in blocked shots with 1.9 per game.

On 18 December 2020, Timmins signed in Estonia with Tallinna Kalev/TLÜ of the Korvpalli Meistriliiga and Baltic Basketball League. In six games, he averaged 10.7 points, 9.7 rebounds, 1.3 assists, 1.5 steals and 2.2 blocks per game. After returning to New Zealand, he joined the Otago Nuggets for the 2021 New Zealand NBL season. On 15 May, he recorded 29 points and 25 rebounds in a 92–85 overtime win over the Manawatu Jets. On 10 June, he recorded 18 points, 18 rebounds and 10 assists in a 95–82 win over the Canterbury Rams.

On 30 June 2021, Timmins signed with the New Zealand Breakers of the Australian National Basketball League (NBL) on a one-year development contract, with a club option for a second year. On 15 April 2022, he was elevated to the full roster following the departure of Yanni Wetzell. In 15 games during the 2021–22 NBL season, he averaged 3.3 points and 2.3 rebounds per game.

Timmins re-joined the Nuggets for the 2022 New Zealand NBL season and helped the team win the championship.

On 28 April 2022, Timmins re-signed with the Breakers for the 2022–23 NBL season.

Timmins is set to re-join the Nuggets for the 2023 New Zealand NBL season.

National team career
In June 2015, Timmins helped New Zealand win the FIBA 3x3 Under-18 World Championship in Hungary. He was also a member of the Tall Blacks extended squad in the lead up to the 2015 FIBA Oceania Championship.

On 12 July 2017, Timmins was invited to a six-day Tall Blacks camp in Auckland, ahead of a final 12-man roster being named to travel to the FIBA Asia Cup in Lebanon, via preparation matches in China.

Career statistics

College

|-
| style="text-align:left;"| 2016–17
| style="text-align:left;"| Washington
| 31 || 18 || 14.5 || .489 || .286 || .375 || 3.8 || .3 || .4 || .6 || 3.2
|-
| style="text-align:left;"| 2017–18
| style="text-align:left;"| Washington
| 34 || 34 || 18.0 || .577 || – || .559 || 4.6 || .2 || .4 || 1.0 || 4.3
|-
| style="text-align:left;"| 2018–19
| style="text-align:left;"| Washington
| 36 || 7 || 10.4 || .620 || – || .364 || 2.2 || .3 || .3 || .7 || 1.9
|-
| style="text-align:left;"| 2019–20
| style="text-align:left;"| Washington
| 31 || 2 || 7.9 || .625 || .375 || .588 || 1.4 || .2 || .2 || .4 || 2.0
|- class="sortbottom"
| style="text-align:center;" colspan="2"| Career
| 132 || 61 || 12.7 || .563 || .333 || .500 || 3.0 || .2 || .3 || .7 || 2.8

Personal life
Timmins is the son of Brendon and Karen Timmins, and has a sister named Ruby. His father played 74 games for the Otago rugby team and 42 games for the Highlanders, while his mother played netball for Southland. His grandmother, Sandra McGookin, was a six-time New Zealand javelin champion.

References

External links

FIBA.com profile
Canterbury Rams player profile
Washington Huskies bio
GoHuskies.com interview
"Slammin' Sam Timmins heads first wave of intake for groundbreaking 2020 NBL" at stuff.co.nz
"Timmins returning for 3x3" at odt.co.nz
"Timmins playing for team his heart is in" at odt.co.nz

1997 births
Living people
Basketball players at the 2014 Summer Youth Olympics
BC Tallinn Kalev players
Canterbury Rams players
Centers (basketball)
Franklin Bulls players
New Zealand Breakers players
New Zealand expatriate basketball people in the United States
New Zealand men's basketball players
Otago Nuggets players
Power forwards (basketball)
Sportspeople from Dunedin
Washington Huskies men's basketball players